The following radio stations broadcast on FM frequency 90.1 MHz:

Argentina 
 FM La Boca in Buenos Aires 
 Keops in La Plata, Buenos Aires 
 LRS761 in Casilda, Santa Fe
 Mega 90.1 in Mar del Plata, Buenos Aires 
 Radio 2 in Rosario, Santa Fe 
 Radio María in Carhué, Buenos Aires
 Radio María in Sampacho, Córdoba
 Radio María in Pico Truncado, Santa Cruz
 Radio María in San Juan
 Radio Sur in Córdoba

Australia
 2NBC in Sydney, New South Wales
 Radio National in Gold Coast, Queensland
 4RBZ in Stanthorpe, Queensland
 TOTE Sport Radio in Launceston, Tasmania

Canada (Channel 211)
 CBBS-FM in Sudbury, Ontario
 CBCX-FM-1 in Edmonton, Alberta
 CBFX-FM-5 in Gaspe, Quebec
 CBIB-FM in Bay St. Lawrence, Nova Scotia
 CBQI-FM in Atikokan, Ontario
 CBTL-FM in Millertown, Newfoundland and Labrador
 CBUA-FM in Atlin, British Columbia
 CBV-FM-8 in Thetford-Mines, Quebec
 CFBL-FM in Bearskin Lake, Ontario
 CFBY-FM in Poplar Hill, Ontario
 CFEY-FM in Sachigo Lake, Ontario
 CFJU-FM in Kedgwick, New Brunswick
 CFKL-FM in Kingfisher Lake, Ontario
 CFKP-FM in Kasabonika Lake, Ontario
 CFLR-FM in La Romaine, Quebec
 CFNP-FM in Naicatchewenin, Ontario
 CFNS-FM in Fort Lawrence, Nova Scotia
 CFOG-FM in Luscar, Alberta
 CHBJ-FM in Slate Falls, Ontario
 CHMZ-FM in Tofino, British Columbia
 CHPM-FM in Wunnummin Lake, Ontario
 CHWL-FM in Weagamow Lake, Ontario
 CIBE-FM in St-Augustin, Quebec
 CIFM-FM-9 in Sun Peaks, British Columbia
 CIRM-FM in Moncton, New Brunswick
 CITN-FM in Nain, Newfoundland and Labrador
 CJLF-FM-1 in Owen Sound, Ontario
 CJMP-FM in Powell River, British Columbia
 CJSF-FM in Burnaby, British Columbia
 CKAS-FM in Kashechewan, Ontario
 CKAU-FM-1 in Sept-Iles, Quebec
 CKDL-FM in Deer Lake, Ontario
 CKFA-FM in Fort Albany, Ontario
 CKFS-FM in Fort Severn, Ontario
 CKPN-FM in Webequie, Ontario
 CKSF-FM in Prince Albert, Saskatchewan
 VF2308 in Greenhills Mine Site, British Columbia
 VF2408 in Sunshine Valley, British Columbia
 VF2427 in Spences Bridge, British Columbia
 VF8007 in Acton Vale, Quebec
 VF8016 in St. Thomas, Ontario

China 
 CNR Kazakh Radio in Xinjiang
 CRI Hit FM in Xiamen (formerly News Radio before July 2017, stopped airing in May 2018)
 CRI News Radio in Hefei (stopped airing in August 2020)

Japan
 JOTR-FM in Akita, Akita
 SBS Radio in Mishima, Shizuoka
 NHK Radio 1 in Hiroo, Hokkaido

Malaysia
 Hot FM in Johor Bahru, Johor and Singapore
 Sandakan FM in Sandakan, Sabah
 TraXX FM in Ipoh, Perak

Mexico
XHAH-FM in Juchitán de Zaragoza, Oaxaca
XHCCFC-FM in Concepción del Oro, Zacatecas
XHCHL-FM in Los Ramones, Nuevo León
XHCHT-FM in Chalcatongo de Hidalgo, Oaxaca
XHENO-FM in Metepec, Estado de México
XHGNS-FM in Guerrero Negro, Baja California Sur
XHGYS-FM in Guaymas, Sonora
 XHHIL-FM in Benjamin Hill, Sonora
 XHLCE-FM in La Cruz, Sinaloa
XHLL-FM in Boca del Río, Veracruz
XHLQ-FM in Morelia, Michoacán
XHMIL-FM in Los Mochis, Sinaloa
XHMU-FM in Tampico, Tamaulipas
XHNQ-FM in Tulancingo (Singuilucan), Hidalgo
XHPECA-FM in Pláxedis G Guerrero, Chihuahua
XHPSJI-FM in San José Iturbide, Guanajuato
XHQW-FM in Mérida, Yucatán
XHRS-FM in Puebla, Puebla
 XHRYS-FM in Reynosa, Tamaulipas
XHSAT-FM in Villahermosa, Tabasco
XHSCEL-FM in Peribán, Michoacán
XHSMR-FM in Villa de Pozos, San Luis Potosí
XHTGO-FM in Tlaltenango (Guadalupe Victoria), Zacatecas
XHTUJ-FM in Tuxpan, Jalisco
 XHUA-FM in Chihuahua, Chihuahua
XHW-FM in La Paz, Baja California Sur

New Zealand 

 The Breeze in Otematata, Canterbury
 Coast in Sumner, Canterbury
 The Hits in Wellington
 Magic Talk in Westport
 More FM in Gisborne

Taiwan
 Hit FM in Kaohsiung

United States (Channel 211)
 KADU in Hibbing, Minnesota
 KAJC in Salem, Oregon
 KAMY in Lubbock, Texas
 KBCZ in Boulder Creek, California
  in Moberly, Missouri
 KBLW in Billings, Montana
 KBNV in Fayetteville, Arkansas
 KBPK in Buena Park, California
 KBSG in Raymond, Washington
 KCBX in San Luis Obispo, California
 KCDS-LP in Tucson, Arizona
 KCEI in Red River, New Mexico
  in Denver, Colorado
 KCVC in Cherry Valley, Arkansas
 KDNM in Reserve, New Mexico
 KEEA in Aberdeen, South Dakota
 KERA (FM) in Dallas, Texas
 KFJS in North Platte, Nebraska
  in Hutchinson, Kansas
 KHCO in Hayden, Colorado
 KHLV in Helena, Montana
 KHRV in Hood River, Oregon
 KHSF in Ferndale, California
 KILI in Porcupine, South Dakota
 KJZP in Prescott, Arizona
 KKFI in Kansas City, Missouri
 KLRD in Yucaipa, California
 KLRO in Hot Springs, Arkansas
 KNCH in San Angelo, Texas
 KNEF in Franklin, Nebraska
 KNIZ in Gallup, New Mexico
  in Havre, Montana
  in Austin, Minnesota
  in Cottonwood, Idaho
  in Port Angeles, Washington
 KOBN in Burns, Oregon
  in Altus, Oklahoma
 KOJB in Cass Lake, Minnesota
 KOLU in Pasco, Washington
 KPFT in Houston, Texas
  in Olympia, Washington
 KQDL in Hood River, Oregon
  in Hawthorne, Nevada
  in Omak, Washington
 KRHS in Overland, Missouri
  in Roswell, New Mexico
  in Bisbee, Arizona
 KSAK in Walnut, California
  in Nacogdoches, Texas
 KSCV (FM) in Springfield, Missouri
  in Sioux Falls, South Dakota
  in Collegeville, Minnesota
  in Ashland, Oregon
 KSRQ in Thief River Falls, Minnesota
 KSVU in Hamilton, Washington
  in San Antonio, Texas
  in Bakersfield, California
 KTUH in Honolulu, Hawaii
  in Ingram, Texas
 KUCO (FM) in Edmond, Oklahoma
 KUCO-HD2 in Edmond, Oklahoma
  in Salt Lake City, Utah
  in Tacoma, Washington
  in Ignacio, Colorado
  in Laramie, Wyoming
  in Powell, Wyoming
 KVLQ in La Pine, Oregon
  in Parker, Arizona
 KXQJ in Clarksville, Texas
 KYAC in Mill City, Oregon
  in Stockton, California
 KYEJ-LP in Fairmont, Minnesota
  in Chico, California
 KZLW in Gretna, Nebraska
  in Moab, Utah
 KZNK in Brewster, Kansas
  in Stanford, California
 WABE in Atlanta, Georgia
 WARV-FM in Colonial Heights, Virginia
  in Marion, Illinois
 WBED in Bedford, Indiana
  in Woods Hole, Massachusetts
  in Buies Creek, North Carolina
 WCDV-FM in Trout Run, Pennsylvania
  in Washington, District of Columbia
  in Richmond, Virginia
 WDLG in Thomasville, Alabama
  in Willimantic, Connecticut
 WEFT in Champaign, Illinois
 WEKP in Pineville, Kentucky
  in Greenville, South Carolina
 WFBV in Selinsgrove, Pennsylvania
 WFRU in Quincy, Florida
  in Indianapolis, Indiana
  in Fort Myers, Florida
  in Greece, New York
 WGPO in Grand Portage, Minnesota
  in South Kent, Connecticut
 WHBP in Harbor Springs, Michigan
 WHMC-FM in Conway, South Carolina
 WHRX in Nassawadox, Virginia
 WIFF (FM) in Binghamton, New York
 WITH (FM) in Ithaca, New York
  in Indiana, Pennsylvania
  in Christiansted, Virgin Islands
  in Upton, Kentucky
  in Pastillo, Puerto Rico
 WJEE in Bolivar, Ohio
  in Jacksonville, North Carolina
  in Huntsville, Alabama
  in Pikeville, Kentucky
 WJUF in Inverness, Florida
  in Jackson, Tennessee
 WKTS in Kingston, Tennessee
  in Watertown, New York
 WKYP in Ledbetter, Kentucky
 WLLM-FM in Carlinville, Illinois
  in Chicago, Illinois
 WMBT-LP in Gainesville, Florida
 WMEA (FM) in Portland, Maine
 WMFU in Mount Hope, New York
  in Malone, New York
  in Jackson, Mississippi
  in Chase City, Virginia
  in Greensboro, North Carolina
  in Marquette, Michigan
 WOHC in Chillicothe, Ohio
  in Ames, Iowa
  in Delhi Hills, Ohio
 WORQ in Green Bay, Wisconsin
  in Zanesville, Ohio
 WOVV in Ocracoke, North Carolina
 WOXM in Middlebury, Vermont
 WPGT in Lake City, Florida
 WPRR-FM in Clyde Township, Michigan
 WPSX (FM) in Kane, Pennsylvania
 WPUT (FM) in North Salem, New York
  in Waynesboro, Virginia
  in Princeton, West Virginia
  in Hamilton, New York
  in Philadelphia, Pennsylvania
  in Burlington, Vermont
  in Shelton, Connecticut
  in Wellfleet, Massachusetts
 WSDM in Wadesville, Indiana
  in Baker, Florida
  in Bay City, Michigan
 WUSB (FM) in Stony Brook, New York
 WVCS (FM) in Owen, Wisconsin
  in New Castle, Pennsylvania
 WVRS in Gore, Virginia
  in Upper Sandusky, Ohio
 WXVS in Waycross, Georgia
 WYBA in Coldwater, Michigan
 WYPW-LP in Brandon, Florida
 WYQQ in Charlton, Massachusetts
 WYXA in Clarksburg, West Virginia
 WZPE in Bath, North Carolina
 WZRU in Garysburg, North Carolina
 WZXN in Newburg, Pennsylvania
 WZYZ in Spencer, Tennessee

References

Lists of radio stations by frequency